Daniel Alexander Payne Murray (1852–1925) was an American bibliographer, author, politician, and historian.  He also worked as an assistant librarian at the Library of Congress.

Biography
Murray was born in Baltimore, Maryland, on March 3, 1852. In 1861, he went to work at the United States Senate Restaurant managed by his brother who was also a caterer. He joined the professional staff of the Library of Congress in 1871. He was eighteen years old, and only the second Black American to work for the Library at a time when the Library of Congress. Murray became the full-time personal assistant to the Librarian of Congress, Ainsworth Rand Spofford in 1874.

By 1881, he had risen to become assistant librarian, a position he held for forty-one years. For a brief period in 1897, he was the chief of the periodical division. He was returned to his former post when other employees did not respect him due to his waste. Murray married educator Anna Jane Evans (1858–1955) on April 2, 1879, with whom he had seven children (five lived to adulthood); the couple became a major force in the social and civic life of the District of Columbia.

African American writings
Murray began to compile a collection of books and pamphlets authored by African Americans at the request of Herbert Putnam, the successor to Spofford. The collection of work by "Negro Authors" was to be a part of The Exhibit of American Negroes at the 1900 Paris Exposition. In 1900 Murray published a list of the collections' holdings to date and appealed for additions to the list through donations. After several months, his list had grown to eleven hundred titles. The Library of Congress's "Colored Authors' Collection" originated from his efforts. Now known as the "Daniel A. P. Murray Pamphlet Collection", it contains works dating from 1821 by such authors as Frederick Douglass, Booker T. Washington, Ida B. Wells-Barnett, Benjamin W. Arnett, and Alexander Crummell. Murray planned to expand his collection and create an encyclopedia of African-American achievement; unfortunately, the project never received sufficient support to become a reality.

Daniel Murray's intended collection was never published, the smaller pamphlet he had composed for the Exhibit at the Paris Exposition was additionally placed in the Library of Congress. This pamphlet, titled, "Preliminary List of Books and Pamphlets by Negro Authors: For Paris Exposition and Library of Congress" became the LOC's first bibliography of African American literature.

African American affairs
Murray was widely acknowledged as an authority on African-American concerns. He was the first African-American member of the Washington Board of Trade, and he testified before the House of Representatives about Jim Crow laws and the migration of African-Americans from rural locations to urban areas. He was twice a delegate to the Republican National Convention and was a member of many other councils and organizations.

He was also a prolific author, and a frequent contributor to African American journals, in particular The Voice of the Negro. He was also well known for his writings on African American history, including his monumental but uncompleted Historical and Biographical Encyclopedia of the Colored Race. Murray's personal library of African American works was bequeathed to the Library of Congress upon his death March 31, 1925.

References

External links

African American Perspectives: Pamphlets from the Daniel A. P. Murray Collection, 1818-1907
Daniel A. P. Murray Pamphlet Collection
Daniel A. P. Murray
Deloris Williams My North Carolina Roots wc.rootsweb.ancestry.com (including: From Vol. 1. No. 15 - May 5, 1999 / "Finding The Good and Praising It" / A Celebration of the Jewels Mothers (Part 3): / Mrs. Anna Evans Murray, / Mother of Jewel Nathaniel Allison Murray)

1852 births
1925 deaths
African-American historians
American male non-fiction writers
American bibliographers
Librarians at the Library of Congress
Writers from Baltimore
Burials at Woodlawn Cemetery (Washington, D.C.)
Academics from Maryland
Maryland Republicans
African-American librarians
American librarians
Historians from Maryland
20th-century African-American people
African-American male writers